Match Race Germany is an annual match racing sailing competition and event on the World Match Racing Tour. It is sailed in Bavaria 40 yachts.

Winners

References

Sailing competitions in Germany
World Match Racing Tour
Match racing competitions
Recurring sporting events established in 1997